Magilligan Point railway station served Magilligan Point in County Londonderry in Northern Ireland.

The Londonderry and Coleraine Railway opened the station on 1 July 1855, and it was served via a horse-drawn tramway.

It closed on 1 October 1855.

Routes

References

Disused railway stations in County Londonderry
Railway stations opened in 1855
Railway stations closed in 1855
1855 establishments in Ireland
Railway stations in Northern Ireland opened in the 19th century